Aatagadu is a 1980 Indian Telugu-language action film, produced by G. Rajendra Prasad and directed by T. Rama Rao. It stars N. T. Rama Rao and Sridevi, with music composed by Chakravarthy.

Plot 
Gopi is a famous pop singer who performs in the Jolly club and all the young girls of the city are mad about him. The club owner Jagannatham (Mikkilineni) takes care of Gopi as his son. Once, Gopi gets acquainted with a petty thief, Vijaya, who kicks Gopi and runs away. Another time, Vijaya steals Gopi's car, but she is caught by him. She says that she is doing these robberies to feed her brother who suffers from polio. Gopi gives assurance to him that he will help her, gets her a job and both of them fall in love. In the same city, there are three traitors Sangeetha Rao, Gopal Rao and Papa Rao who do illegal business. Sangeetha Rao is a smuggler, Papa Rao does woman trafficking and Gopal Rao does liquor business. All clubs in the city have to follow their instructions, or they will ruin them. But they could not succeed to spoil the Jolly club because of Gopi and they develop an enmity against him. Meanwhile, Gopi introduces Vijaya to his mother Parvathi, and sister Padma and Vijaya learn that Gopi's father left them in his childhood. Vijaya has a past, her parents were brutally killed by one Aggi Ramudu, on whom she wants to take revenge, but he is presently in jail. Here, Vijaya wants to utilize Gopi in breaking Aggi Ramudu out of jail. So she plots a plan, she makes Gopi believe that Aggi Ramudu knows the whereabouts of his father; if they could bring him out, he can find his father. So, Gopi plans and succeeds in his attempt. After reaching home, Vijaya tries to kill Aggi Ramudu, but Gopi stops her. Surprisingly, Aggi Ramudu turns out to be Gopi's father, Parvathi recognizes him when Gopi questions them, then Aggi Ramudu starts revealing the past. He used to work as Manager Ramaiah, at the home of a millionaire, Dharma Rao, Ramaiah is most loyal and efficient towards him. In a contract, his three partners, none other than Sangeetha Rao, Gopal Rao, and Papa Rao commit a huge fraud, which was caught by Ramaiah. So, they kill Dharma Rao and blamed Ramaiah, for which he is sentenced. They also steal a golden idol of Lord Venkateswara, which came from the ancestors of Dharma Rao. Eventually, Vijaya turns out to be Dharma Rao's daughter, who mistakes Ramaiah as the murderer, that's why she wants to kill him. Meanwhile, the traitors place a bomb and demolish the club in which Jaganadham dies. Gopi takes an oath that he will see the end of the people who killed his foster father. Gopi turns as Aggi Ramudu changes his attire, in various forms of disguise, he sees the end of his enemies and protects the idol. Finally, the movie ends on a happy note with the marriage of Gopi and Vijaya.

Cast 
N. T. Rama Rao as Gopi
Sridevi as Vijaya
Rao Gopala Rao as Gopal Rao
Satyanarayana as Sangeeta Rao
Allu Ramalingaiah as Papa Rao
Jaggayya as Ramaiah / Aggi Ramudu
Prabhakar Reddy as Dharma Rao
Padmanabham as Kirai Kattula Rathaiah
Nutan Prasad as Ragala Rangaiah
Mikkilineni as Jagannatham
Raavi Kondala Rao as Jailor Nageswara Rao
Chalapathi Rao as Bhairava
Jagga Rao as Thief
Pushpalatha as Parvathi
Jayamalini as an item number
Attili Lakshmi as Lakshmi

Soundtrack 

Music composed by Chakravarthy. Lyrics were written by Veturi.

References

External links 
 

1980 action films
1980 films
1980s Telugu-language films
Films scored by K. Chakravarthy
Indian action films